Cumandá Canton is a canton of Ecuador, located in the Chimborazo Province.  Its capital is the town of Cumandá.  Its population at the 2001 census was 12,474.

References

Cantons of Chimborazo Province